Banff Lodging Company is  a locally owned and operated hospitality company in the Banff National Park.

History 
Banff Lodging Co was founded in 1985 by Wim Pauw when he acquired Caribou Corner, his first commercial mall. The company started with commercial buildings in downtown Banff, Alberta and launched its hospitality business with the opening of its first hotel and restaurant The Banff Caribou Lodge and The Keg. 

1985 - Caribou Corner 202 & 204 Banff Avenue, a commercial mall; Banff is designated as UNESCO World Heritage Site.
1988 - Wolf and Bear Mall 227 & 229 Bear Street is built; Kirby Lane Mall at 119 Banff Avenue is built.
1991 - Town Centre Mall 201, 203, & 205 Banff Avenue is built.
1993 - Hospitality business launches with the opening of its first hotel and restaurant, The Banff Caribou Lodge and The Keg.
1995 - Chustas Mall 117 Banff Ave is built; 2nd Keg Restaurant opens at 117 Banff Ave.
1996 - Banff Ptarmigan Inn and Arrow Motel are acquired.
1999 - Banff Ptarmigan Inn receives major renovations and a wing is now named Driftwood Inn.
2000 - Hidden Ridge Resort is acquired.
2002 - Rundle Manor Apt is acquired.
2003 - Hidden Ridge Resort completes phase 1 of expansion.
2005 - Inns of Banff, Swiss Village, Reflections Wildfire Grill are acquired.
2007 - Fox Hotel & Suites and Chili's Grill & Bar are built.
2009 - Hidden Ridge Resort final phases of renovations complete. (new lobby, hot tubs, parkade, and units are added).
2010 - Ultimate Ski & Ride, ski rental and retail store is acquired (April 30, 2010). 
2010 - Banff Rocky Mountain Resort (purchased June 1, 2010).
2011 - Banff railway station leasehold is acquired.
2011 - Wild Bill's Legendary Saloon (purchased May 1, 2011).
2014 - Lux Cinema Centre is purchased (April 2014).
2014 - Tunnel Mountain Resort is acquired (July 2014).
2014 - Bumpers Inn is acquired (December 2014).
2014 - Demolished the Driftwood Inn, Arrow Motel, Rundle Manor Apt (October - December)
2015 - Moose Hotel & Suites build is started (January)
2016 - Moose Hotel & Suites opens to the public (July)
2018 - Rocky Mountain Ski Lodge, first hotel in Canmore is acquired (April 2018)
2019 - Bumpers Inn is closed permanently and undergoes major renovations (Oct 2019)
2020 - The Dorothy Motel opens to guests
2020 - Red Carpet Inn, Irwin's Mountain Inn, The Rundlestone Lodge are acquired (Dec 15, 2020)

Properties

Commercial Properties
Caribou Corner Mall
Wolf & Bear Street Mall
Town Centre Mall
Chustas Mall

Accommodations 
Banff Caribou Lodge & Spa
Banff Ptarmigan Inn
The Dorothy Motel
Hidden Ridge Resort
Tunnel Mountain Resort
Red Carpet Inn
Irwin's Mountain Inn
The Rundlestone Lodge
Fox Hotel & Suites
Banff Rocky Mountain Resort
Moose Hotel and Suites
Rocky Mountain Ski Lodge
Pocaterra Inn and Waterslide

Restaurants
The Keg Steakhouse & Bar (Banff Caribou Lodge & Spa)
The Keg Steakhouse & Bar (Downtown Chustas Mall)
The Meatball Pizza & Pasta (Ptarmigan Inn)
Chili's Grill & Restaurant (Fox Hotel and Suites)
Alpha Bistro (Banff Rocky Mountain Resort)
Pacini (Moose Hotel & Suites)

Other Divisions
 Red Earth Spa (Banff Caribou Lodge)
 Meadow Spa & Pools (Moose Hotel & Suites)
 Ultimate Ski & Ride (Caribou Corner Mall)
 Lux Theatre (Wolf & Bear Mall)

External links 
Banff Lodging Co
Red Earth Spa
Meadow Spa & Pools
Ultimate Ski & Ride
Lux Cinema Banff
Banff Commercial Leasing 
Banff Lake Louise Tourism 
Town of Banff
Hotel and leisure companies of Canada
Banff National Park
Companies based in Alberta